Melissa Hamilton is a chef, cookbook author and was the head of Saveur’s test kitchen.

Biography
Hamilton comes from a culinary family. Her father owns Hamilton’s Grill Room in Erwinna, Pennsylvania and sister Gabrielle owns a restaurant in NYC named Prune.

Career
Along with partner Christopher Hirsheimer, they founded a magazine named Canal House Cooking.  In 2013, the team won a James Beard Award for the best book in the General Cooking category. The book was called Canal House Cooks Every Day.

They also openedCanal House Station in July 2019, a restaurant in Milford, New Jersey which was nominated for a 2022 James Beard Award.

References

External links
The Lennon-McCartney of Cookbook Authors?

American women chefs
American cookbook writers
Chefs from New Jersey
James Beard Foundation Award winners
Living people
Year of birth missing (living people)